Demoticist may refer to:

A follower of Demoticism, the Greek cultural and political movement
An expert on the Demotic (Egyptian) script, usually called a demotist